German submarine U-539 was a Type IXC/40 U-boat of Nazi Germany's Kriegsmarine during World War II. The submarine was laid down on 8 May 1942 at the Deutsche Werft yard in Hamburg as yard number 360, launched on 4 December 1942, and commissioned on 24 February 1943 under the command of Oberleutnant zur See Hans-Jürgen Lauterbach-Emden. After training with the 4th U-boat Flotilla in the Baltic Sea, the boat was transferred to the 10th U-boat Flotilla for front-line service on 1 July 1943. She carried out three war patrols, sinking one ship and damaged two more. Transferred to the 33rd U-boat Flotilla on 1 October 1944, she sailed on no further patrols, and surrendered to Allied forces on 9 May 1945. Transferred from Bergen, Norway, to Loch Ryan, Scotland, she foundered on 4 December 1945 while being towed to the scuttling grounds as part of "Operation Deadlight".

Design
German Type IXC/40 submarines were slightly larger than the original Type IXCs. U-539 had a displacement of  when at the surface and  while submerged. She had two shafts and two  propellers.

U-539 was fitted with six  torpedo tubes (four fitted at the bow and two at the stern), 22 torpedoes, one  SK C/32 naval gun, 180 rounds, and a  SK C/30 as well as a  C/30 anti-aircraft gun. The boat had a complement of forty-eight.

Service history

First patrol
The U-boat sailed from Kiel on 4 September 1943 for a three-day voyage to Bergen, before commencing her first war patrol on the 14th. U-539 sailed out into the north Atlantic, and patrolled the waters between Iceland and Greenland. She had no successes, and was attacked by aircraft three times.

On 21 September the U-boat was attacked by a British Lockheed Hudson bomber of No. 269 Squadron RAF, southeast of Iceland. The submarine avoided the aircraft's bombs and depth charges, and escaped by diving. On 4 October a British B-24 Liberator bomber of 120 Squadron, escorting Convoy ONS-19 attacked, but was hit by the U-boat's flak, setting both starboard engines on fire and causing it to crash, killing all eight crew. The aircraft's depth charges caused only minor damage, and a crewman was slightly wounded by strafing. Finally, on 8 October, an unknown Liberator southeast of Greenland dropped two depth charges, causing serious damage to the U-boat.

The U-boat arrived at Lorient in occupied France on 23 October 1943 after 40 days at sea.

Second patrol
U-539 departed Lorient on 2 January 1944, as the first U-boat to sail on combat patrol equipped with the Schnorchel breathing device. She sailed across the Atlantic to the waters south of Newfoundland, but had no successes. She returned to Saint-Nazaire on 21 March.

Third patrol
The U-boat departed from Saint-Nazaire for her third and final war patrol on 1 May 1944. She sailed back across the Atlantic and into the Caribbean Sea. There, on 5 June, she torpedoed and sank the 1,517 GRT Panama-registered Danish ship Pillory off Puerto Rico with the loss of 25 from her crew of 47.

On 11 June, she fired two torpedoes at the 2,701 GRT Dutch tanker Casandra, before surfacing to fire at the ship with her deck gun. However the ship fought back and damaged the U-boat with machine-gun fire, forcing her to break off the attack.

The next day, 12 June, an American Mariner patrol bomber attacked the U-boat, but she got away once again.

On 4 July, the U-539, attacked the 10,195 GRT American Type T2 tanker Kittanning, about 40 miles northeast of Cristóbal, Panama, and hit her with three torpedoes, ripping a hole 65 feet long and 20 feet high on her starboard side. The crew of 74 abandoned ship in four lifeboats, but the tanker remained afloat. Two Coast Guard cutters,  and  arrived to pick up the survivors and take the ship in tow to Cristobal.

U-539 arrived at Flensburg on 22 September, after a patrol lasting 145 days, her longest.

Fate
In mid-April 1945 U-539 sailed to Horten Naval Base, then to Bergen in early May, arriving there three days before the German surrender on 9 May 1945. The U-boat was transferred from Bergen to Loch Ryan in Scotland on 2 June 1945 for Operation Deadlight. On 4 December 1945, while under tow to the scuttling grounds she foundered in position .

Summary of raiding history

References

Bibliography

External links

German Type IX submarines
U-boats commissioned in 1943
World War II submarines of Germany
U-boats sunk in 1945
Operation Deadlight
1942 ships
Ships built in Hamburg
Maritime incidents in December 1945